Kemps Creek may refer to:

Kemps Creek, New South Wales, a suburb of Sydney, Australia
Kemps Creek (New South Wales), a stream in Australia
Kemp Creek, a stream in the U.S. state of Georgia sometimes called "Kemps Creek"